Luis Leonardo Almagro Lemes (born June 1, 1963) is a Uruguayan lawyer, diplomat, and politician who currently serves as the 10th Secretary General of the Organization of American States (OAS) since 2015. A former member of the Broad Front, Almagro served as Minister of Foreign Relations of Uruguay from 2010 to 2015 under president José Mujica.

Almagro served as Uruguay's Ambassador to the People's Republic of China from 2005 to 2010. He had previously held different positions at the Ministry of Foreign Relations. After the 2009 general election, then-president-elect José Mujica appointed him foreign minister, taking office in March 2010, succeeding Pedro Vaz. During his tenure in the Mujica administration, the country received several detainees from the Guantanamo Bay detention camp and dozens of Syrian families who were civilian victims, as well as maintained a military presence in Haiti to ensure the reconstruction process after the 2010 earthquake. 

After leaving government service, Almagro was elected Senator of the Republic in 2014 for the 48th Legislature and assumed his seat in March 2015, however, he resigned a few months later to take office as Secretary General of the Organization of American States (OAS). On March 20, 2020, the OAS General Assembly re-elected him in office for a second term until 2025.

Early life and education 
Luis Almagro was born June 1, 1963, in Cerro Chato, Paysandú Department. Almagro studied at the University of the Republic, where he earned his law degree. During his 23-year career with the Uruguayan Foreign Ministry, he represented Uruguay in the Islamic Republic of Iran (1991–1996), in Germany (1998–2003), as well as serving as Ambassador to China (2007–2010). He is fluent in Spanish, English, and French.

Foreign Minister of Uruguay
During Almagro's time as Foreign Minister (2010–2015), Uruguay drew global recognition for a small South American country as they were the largest per capita contributor to UN peacekeeping forces  as well as secured Uruguay's successful election seat to the UN Security Council. Almagro also supported efforts on the restoration of relations between Cuba and the US.

Almagro's commitment to human rights extended to domestic affairs as demonstrated by the active role in the repeal of the 1986 Expiry Law, which granted amnesty for crimes and human rights abuses committed during the civic-military dictatorship between 1973 and 1985, and actively supported prosecutions for these crimes.

A lawyer, Almagro was a member of the Executive Committee that drafted the groundbreaking legislation regulating the possession, growth, and distribution of marijuana in Uruguay in 2013. Uruguay is the first country in the world to introduce legislation of its kind. He also represented Uruguay at the International Centre for Settlement of Investment Disputes (ICSID), in the suit brought by Philip Morris International against Uruguay for its anti-tobacco policies. After six years, ICSID ruled in favor of Uruguay.

Also responsible for trade, Almagro also played a key role in expanding and diversifying Uruguay market access, raising exports each year of his term. A key focus was opening up non-traditional markets to Uruguayan exporters, including as securing access to key US markets for Uruguay's citrus fruit.

A strong advocate for refugees, Almagro played an integral role in negotiating the transfer of a group of ex-detenidos (former detainees) from Guantanamo Bay detention camp to Uruguay. Almagro also led the process to welcome dozens of Syrian refugees to Uruguay, along with former President Mujica. For this they were listed among Foreign Policy magazine's top Global Thinkers for 2014. Almagro is one of only 10 decision-makers in the region to be awarded this international distinction. In 2018, Almagro was listed 4th in the ranking of top 100 leaders from multilateral organizations.

Secretary General of the OAS

Election 

Almagro was elected Secretary General of the Organization of American States on March 18, 2015, earning the support of 33 of the 34 Members States, including one abstention. He officially took office on May 26, 2015.

Almagro's first year in office was marked by his outspoken stance on democracy and human rights. His leadership has widely been seen as reinvigorating an Organization.[7]

His election campaign centered on the idea of "More Rights for More People". In addition to four programmatic pillars of democracy, human rights, security and development, he announced a set of new strategic initiatives to achieve this goal including

 The OAS School of Governance to train civil servants and civil society with the tools for transparent and accountable government
 The Inter-American Education System to ensure quality, inclusive, and equitable education
 The Regional System for the Prevention of Social Conflicts to facilitate dialogue between investors, states and communities in key productive sectors.

Under the renewed vision, Almagro continues to champion key OAS initiatives including the Inter-American Human Rights System, the Inter-American Judicial Facilitators Program, the MACCIH, and the Mission to Support the Peace Process in Colombia (MAPP), along with electoral cooperation and observation missions as priorities for the organization.

Haiti 

Following the suspension of the second round of presidential elections on January 24, 2016, President Michel Martelly requested assistance from OAS Secretary General Almagro to facilitate a discussion on finding a way forward. On January 29, an OAS Special Mission travelled to Haiti to assess the situation and help reach an understanding "agreed by Haitians." The Mission engaged in dialogue with key political and civil society stakeholders facilitating a consensus formula for next steps. On February 6, 2016, former President Martelly announced a transitional agreement electing an interim President and confirming a consensus Prime Minister.

After the completion of the Mission, the Representative of Haiti to the OAS, Jean Josué Pierre, applauded the OAS, stating that "the Mission not only supported and accompanied the negotiations, but has reestablished the image of the Organization."

Almagro has been critical of the slow progress to resolve the political impasse; "It is imperative for Haitian political stakeholders, including Parliamentarians and those provisionally governing the country, to fully assume their responsibilities towards the nation. The interests of the Haitian people must supersede partisan interests."

MACCIH

Anticorruption has been a focus from the outset of Secretary Almagro's term. In the spring of 2015, widespread protests erupted when a multi-million corruption scandal involving the Honduran social security system was uncovered by the local media. In August 2015, Honduran President Juan Orlando Hernández invited Secretary General Almagro to Honduras to facilitate a dialogue and response to the protests. Almagro met with government representatives, political parties and civil society on how to end impunity and repair trust between the country's government and its citizens.

On January 19, 2016, Secretary General Almagro and the Government of Honduras signed an agreement creating the OAS Mission to Support the Fight against Corruption and Impunity in Honduras (MACCIH). The MACCIH created an international anti-corruption team of investigators and judges to work with Honduran judges, prosecutors and police officers to better investigate and prosecute complex public corruption cases. While the Mission's focus is to investigate cases involving networks of public and private corruption, it will also support reform in four key areas: preventing and fighting corruption, criminal justice reform, political and electoral reform and public security. The first members of the MACCIH arrived in Honduras in April 2016. 

However in January 2020, the Honduran government dissolved MACCIH after OAS negotiators were unable to secure an agreement with it to renew the body’s mandate.

Venezuela 

In the lead up to the December 2015 parliamentary elections in Venezuela, Secretary General Almagro sent an 18-page open letter to the president of that country's National Electoral Council (CNE) in which he publicly denounced “the Government's violations of human rights and efforts to undermine the December 2015 elections through the monopolization of the media, interference in the election process, oppression of free assembly and the detention of political prisoners″. The letter represented the first open criticism of the Venezuelan government by a senior diplomat from the region. The former president of Uruguay, José Mujica, declares about him : “I regret the direction that you chose to follow and I know it is irreversible, so now, I tell you goodbye”.

As the situation in Venezuela deteriorated dramatically after the December elections, in June 2016, Secretary General Almagro released a 114-page report  detailing the deteriorating economic situation and humanitarian crisis. Under article 20, the Secretary General invoked the Inter-American Democratic Charter on the grounds that Venezuela has experienced "an alteration of the constitutional order". Key recommendations from the report include the immediate release of all political prisoners; implementation of the constitutionally mandated recall referendum before the end of 2016; a return to the balance of powers between the Judicial, Executive, and Legislative branches of government; a bi-partisan review of judicial appointments; and, the establishment of an independent body to combat corruption.

The Secretary General continues to lead the international community in advocating publicly on behalf of political prisoners and for a return to the constitutional order in Venezuela. On September 23, Almagro expressed dismay at the rules and timetable published by the CNE that further delayed the recall process into 2016, guaranteeing that the ruling party remains in power until the end of the term in 2019. "The recall referendum belongs to the people, and it is up to the CNE to ensure the guarantees for the free expression of the people, instead of curtailing and trying to annul their rights."

As the situation in Venezuela worsened, on March 14, 2017, the Secretary General presented an Updated Report on the Situation in Venezuela outlining the further deterioration of the conditions in the country, stating that there had been a complete rupture of the democratic order.

In the wake of the violent protests during the summer of 2017, the Secretary General published a Third Report on the Situation in Venezuela. In this Report, the Secretary General stated that there was “evidence that pointed to the systematic, tactical and strategic use of murder, imprisonment, torture, rape and other forms of sexual violence” are part of a targeted campaign and systemic policy against those who opposed the government. The OAS General Secretariat was tasked with monitoring further developments in Venezuela and to “specifically look at the individuals and institutions that directly or indirectly enable the use of these repressive tactics and tools” to determine whether crimes against humanity have taken place.

A Fourth Report was published detailing the complete elimination of democracy following the establishment of the unconstitutional “National Constituents Assembly” in September 2017.

In July 2017, Secretary General Luis Almagro appointed former International Criminal Court (ICC) Prosecutor, Luis Moreno Ocampo as a Special Advisor on Crimes Against Humanity. In this position, Ocampo helped to define and launch an independent and impartial process to assess whether crimes against humanity have taken place in Venezuela. In September 2017, a Panel of Independent International Experts was established to oversee the process including a series of public hearings that were held at OAS Headquarters in Washington, DC in September, October, and November of that year.

In May 2018, the Panel of Independent Experts released their report indicating that there are reasonable grounds that satisfy the burden of proof required by Article 52 of the Rome Statue, to believe that crimes against humanity had taken place in Venezuela. Shortly after, Secretary General Almagro formally submitted the Report to the Prosecutor of the International Criminal Court, Fatou Bensouda, requesting that the Prosecutor open a full investigation into the situation on an urgent basis.

During subsequent months, the Secretary General worked diligently to identify a coalition of countries to take the historic step of invoking Article 14 of the Rome Statute and refer the situation in Venezuela to the ICC. On September 26, 2018, Argentina, Canada, Chile, Colombia, Paraguay and Peru formally submitted the Article 14 referral to the Prosecutor of the International Criminal Court.

The Secretary General has called upon the international community to consider using all mechanisms available in international law to protect the rights of Venezuelans. This includes, but is not limited to, Responsibility to Protect and International Humanitarian Law.

On October 12, 2017, the newly-elected Supreme Tribunal of Justice, were sworn in the OAS Headquarters. The 33 magistrates, elected by the National Assembly in July 2017, were forced to take office in exile due to political persecution, intimidation and threats of being detained by the Maduro dictatorship.

As the number of Venezuelans fleeing their country reached precedent-setting numbers, in September 2018, Secretary General Almagro established the Working Group on Crisis of Venezuelan Migrants and Refugees of the OAS, chaired by David Smolansky, to provide “solutions to the exodus of the Venezuelan people – the most visible face of the humanitarian crisis in Venezuela – who can today be found walking through the cities and towns of the Americas looking for the bread they cannot get in their own homeland."

Due to his line regarding the Venezuelan crisis, Almagro was expelled by the Broad Front party in Uruguay for "colluding with US imperialism".

Inter-religious dialogue

The initiative "Protecting our Home Common Home: Ensuring more rights for more people in the Americas" is organized through the cooperation of the OAS, the Vatican and the Inter-religious Institute for Dialogue. The inaugural meeting on September 7–8, 2016, established a Hemispheric Network of Dialogue for the Common Home which creates platform for dialogue between countries of OAS Member States and religious leaders to support reconciliation and the search for solutions to promote peace and stability, in line with Article 2 of the OAS Charter.

Nicaragua 
Led by Almagro, the General Secretariat of the OAS activated different diplomatic and denouncing mechanisms to expose the serious situation that the Central American country faces. A project of electoral reforms was agreed between the General Secretariat of the OAS and the government early in 2017 with the objective of strengthening democratic institutions. While the agreement is currently on hold given the ongoing crisis, Secretary Almagro remains a staunch supporter of mechanisms that would allow for redemocratization, and to achieve justice for the hundreds of Nicaraguan victims. In this context, his good offices made possible the first visit on-site visit of the Inter American Human Rights Commission (CIDH, by its initials in Spanish) in many years, and he approved the creation of the Interdisciplinary Group of Independent Experts (GIEI, by its initials in Spanish) to seek truth and help investigate the crimes committed. Facing an attitude of denial from the government, in December 2018 he announced the activation of article 20 of the Inter American Democratic Charter for Nicaragua.

Cuba 
On December 7, 2018, under the leadership of Secretary General Almagro, the OAS hosted the first Conference on the Situation of Human Rights in Cuba since the 2009 Resolution lifting Cuba's suspension from the Organization. The conference included dialogue on the criminality of freedom of Expression in Cuba, as well as the situation of political prisoners and accountability for repressors in the country.

Bolivia 

Almagro and the OAS were also involved in the political crisis in Bolivia following the aftermath of the 2019 Bolivian general election. Disputes over the transparency and legitimacy of the election had occurred after incumbent President Evo Morales was declared the winner with 47.08% of the vote after a 24-hour pause in results transmission; as this was greater than then ten-point margin over his nearest competitor, Carlos Mesa, needed for Morales to be announced as a winner without a run-off second-round vote. Following weeks of widespread protests in Bolivia, as well as calls for a second-round election from several foreign countries, the OAS released the results of its audit on 10 November 2019, claiming to have found "clear manipulation" and significant irregularities. Morales, who had pledged to respect the OAS audit, agreed on the same day to hold new elections, at a date to be determined. However, later on the same day, Morales and his vice president, Álvaro García Linera, resigned from office after losing support from the police and military, which was termed by Morales and his supporters to be a coup d'etat. International politicians, scholars and journalists are divided between describing the event as a coup or popular uprising.

The OAS released a full report of its findings afterwards. However, reports from the Center for Economic and Policy Research and academics John Curiel and Jack Williams, also commissioned by the CEPR, contradicted the OAS conclusions, finding no statistical evidence for the OAS claim of election fraud, and no significant differences between the vote before and after counting was paused. Another study, conducted by independent statisticians from the University of Pennsylvania among other institutions and published in the New York Times, which initially backed Morales' forced resignation, also found the initial OAS analysis unsubstantiated. Almagro has since defended his actions and appeared supportive of the interim government that has assumed power.

Support for women's rights 
During the 2022 Summit of the Americas, Almagro called for a global treaty to end violence against women and girls.

Academic activities 

Almagro has given special lectures and classes at prestigious academic centers including the University of Oxford, New York University, Georgetown University, Harvard University, Syracuse University, UNAM of Mexico, University of Pennsylvania, Boston College, Cambridge University, and University of the Republic of Uruguay, among others.

Ethics breach investigation 
On October 7 2022, The Associated Press reported that Almagro is facing an OAS internal investigation for his open affair with a Mexican-born female member staff twenty years younger than him, which might have breached the organization's code of ethics. Some of the OAS employees as well as diplomats said they feel initmidated and uncomfortable with the woman, who is shown by Almagro's side in several online bios and photos, including in the OAS social media accounts. The organization's ethics code bans relationships with colleagues in a way that interferes “with the performance of their duties or to disadvantage others in the workplace”.

Awards 
2022

 "COA Chairman's Award for Leadership in the Americas". Award by the 52nd Washington Conference on the Americas (Council of the Americas, COA)

2019

“Freedom Flame of Expression” Award by the Center for the Study of Regulations in Telecommunications in Latin America (CERTAL).
Americas Society Gold Medal.
AJC Champion of Democracy Award by American Jewish Committee (AJC).
CHLI Ileana Ros-Lehtinen International Leadership Award by Congressional Hispanic Leadership Institute (CHLI).
Global Equality Champion por el Human Rights Campaign.
Romulo Betancourt Prize for Democratic Diplomacy por el Human Rights Foundation.
Honorary Membership Rotary Club Bethesda-Chevy Chase, by Rotary International, April 2019.

2018

16 de marzo -Recibió el VIII Premio FAES de la Libertad. En honor a la labor de defensa de los valores y la democracia que lleva a cabo el Secretario General de la OEA en América Latina. (España).
12 de abril - Alas de Libertad, Red Liberal de America Latina (RELIAL), in recognition for inspiring others to fight for liberty (WDC)
8 de mayo - Premio al Liderazgo Global 2018 de @YOA_Orchestra (WDC)
15 de mayo - Legislatura de la Ciudad Autónoma de Buenos Aires lo designa “Turista distinguido”, en el marco de su participación en el G20 Cumbre del Consumidor. (Buenos Aires).
20 de julio - Recibe las llaves de la ciudad de Medley (Florida).
9 de agosto - Recibe la distinción “Referente de la humanidad” por parte de la fundación @FJovenesLideres. (Buenos Aires).
25 de agosto -  Recibe la llaves de la ciudad de Miami de manos del Comisionado de Distrito, Wifredo Gort, en evento organizado por la Cámara de Comercio Uruguayo-Americana. (Florida).
8 de septiembre - Recibe premio de la XV Cumbre Latinoamericana de Marketing Político y Gobernanza en Miami. @cumbre_latino. Se lo dedica a todas las víctimas de abusos de DDHH y de las dictaduras que hay en el hemisferio.

2017

 The Oswaldo Paya Prize, which he should have accepted from Rosa María Payá, Director of the Red Latinoamericana de Jóvenes por la Democracia on February 22 in Havana, Cuba. However, this was not possible because the Cuban government itself prevented him from traveling to Cuba to accept the award.
 The Rómulo Betancourt Order of Venezuelan Exile, which he accepted in Doral, Florida, on April 13 from the organization Venezolanos Perseguidos Políticos en el Exilio.
 An award during the XIV Latin American Political Consulting and Governance Summiton April 13 on the Wolfson Campus of Miami Dade College in Florida for his work in defense of democracy and liberty on the continent.
 The Freedom Award from Freedom House, which he received on April 27 in recognition of his work on behalf of Venezuelan political prisoners.
 The 2017 Charles T. Manatt Democracy Award, received on October 2 from the International Foundation for Electoral Systems.
 The Francisco de Miranda Award, received on October 27 for his work defending freedom in the region.
 The Press Freedom Grand Prize from the Inter-American Press Association, received on October 28. The president of the IAPA, Matt Sanders, said Mr. Almagro received the Prize “for his invaluable defense and promotion of freedom of expression and of the press as the very essence of democracy, as is recognized by the Inter-American Democratic Charter.”
 The World Peace Prize from the World Jurist Association, received on October 31.
 Mr. Almagro was also awarded an honorary doctorate from the Universidad de San Martín de Porres, Lima, Peru, on December 7, 2017, for his work to revitalize the OAS, his fight for democracy, and his flagship policy: More rights for more people.
4th place in the Top 100 Leaders List from Multilateral Organisations by Richtopia.

2016

 In Canada he was named one of the 10 most influential Hispanic people, an award that the Canadian Hispanic Business Alliance has given out for the past 10 years.
 He received the Oswaldo Payá Liberty and Life Prize for his “outstanding efforts in defense of democracy.” The Latin American Youth Network for Democracy announced that Mr. Almagro was awarded the prize for “his coherent response to the political and social junctures through which certain countries experiencing crisis and democratic regression in Latin America are traversing.” The award is given to people or institutions who have stood out for their effective promotion and defense of human rights, life, and democracy.
 Secretary General Almagro also received an award from the Inter-American Institute for Democracy (IID). Headed by Carlos Alberto Montaner, the IID chose Mr. Almagro as the winner of the 2016 Francisco Miranda Prize for his committed “defense of liberty and democracy in the Americas.”
 The Secretary General was also selected to receive one of the awards bestowed annually by the Ibero-American Association of Communication (ASICOM) at a ceremony in the Paraninfo Hall at the University of Oviedo, Spain. Sergio Jellinek, the Secretary General’s strategic communications adviser, received the award on his behalf.
 The Secretary General was awarded the 2016 Mark Palmer Prize, which the Community of Democracies gives to diplomats or international officials in recognition of their work to strengthen democracy and promote human rights.
 He was also the recipient of the TIC-Americas 2016 “Entrepreneur of the Year” Award granted by the Young American Business Trust in June 2016.

2014

H prize Secretary General Luis Almagro was granted this distinction by Uruguayan civil society groups in recognition of his firm defense of the rights of the gay, lesbian, bisexual and transgendered persons, both at national level and international level, including on behalf of Uruguay in the various international bodies and organizations of which it is a Member.
Foreign Policy Magazine Global Thinker.

References

External links

 

Biography of Luis Almagro by CIDOB (in Spanish)

Living people
1963 births
Ambassadors of Uruguay to China
Foreign ministers of Uruguay
People from Paysandú
Secretaries General of the Organization of American States
Uruguayan politicians
University of the Republic (Uruguay) alumni